Life's What You Make It may refer to:
 "Life's What You Make It" (Hannah Montana song), 2007
 "Life's What You Make It" (Talk Talk song), 1985
 Life's What You Make It (album), an album by Wendy Moten
 Life's What You Make It (EP) by Placebo, 2016
 "Life Is What You Make It", a novel by Preeti Shenoy
 "Life Is What You Make It", a song by Marvin Hamlisch
 Life Is What You Make It (film), 2017